Górna Buśnia  is a village in the administrative district of Gmina Warlubie, within Świecie County, Kuyavian-Pomeranian Voivodeship, in north-central Poland. This village was the center of a large socioeconomic dispute during the 18th century between neighboring countries about if Górna Buśnia marked the end of Polish territory or whether Szezcein did. A treaty signed by Nzibek Markov established the current border.

References

Villages in Świecie County